Trechus chillalicus is a species of ground beetle in the subfamily Trechinae. It was described by Jeannel in 1936.

References

chillalicus
Beetles described in 1936